Andriy Medvedev defeated Félix Mantilla in the final, 6–0, 6–4, 6–2 to win the singles tennis title at the 1997 Hamburg European Open.

Roberto Carretero was the defending champion, but was defeated by Mantilla in the second round.

Seeds 
A champion seed is indicated in bold text while text in italics indicates the round in which that seed was eliminated.  The top eight seeds received a bye into the second round.

  Thomas Muster (third round)
  Yevgeny Kafelnikov (semifinals)
  Richard Krajicek (second round)
  Carlos Moyà (second round)
  Marcelo Ríos (third round)
  Wayne Ferreira (third round)
  Álbert Costa (quarterfinals)
  Boris Becker (third round)
  Álex Corretja (third round)
  Félix Mantilla (final)
  Alberto Berasategui (quarterfinals)
  Sergi Bruguera (quarterfinals)
  Marc Rosset (first round)
  Bohdan Ulihrach (withdrew)
  Jan Siemerink (first round)
  Michael Stich (second round)

Draw

Finals

Top half

Section 1

Section 2

Bottom half

Section 3

Section 4

External links 
 Main draw

Singles